Hundstad is a surname. Notable people with the surname include:

Jim Hundstad (born 1941), American politician
Turid Hundstad (born 1945), Norwegian civil servant

Norwegian-language surnames